This is a list of Portuguese television related events from 2007.

Events
19 March - :2 is reverted to its previous title of RTP2 with a new logo.
May - Breakdancing group Abstractin' wins the first series of Aqui Há Talento.

Debuts

Television shows

2000s
Operação triunfo (2003-2011)

Ending this year

Births

Deaths